Acmaea mitra, common name the whitecap limpet, is a species of sea snail or true limpet, a marine  gastropod mollusc in the family Acmaeidae, one of the families of true limpets.

Taxonomy 
Acmaea mitra was placed in the family Acmaeidae for many years, but based on molecular phylogeny evidence by Nakano & Ozawa (2007) Acmaeidae was synonymized  with Lottiidae. However, this synonymy was subsequently found incorrect, having been the result of contaminated samples, and Acmaea mitra and a related species, Niveotectura pallida form a well-supported clade outside of the Lottiidae, and Acmaeidae was re-established.

Acmaea mitra is the type of the genus Acmaea

References

mitra
Gastropods described in 1833